Mahoba plagidotata is a moth of the subfamily Lymantriinae first described by Francis Walker in 1863. It is found in the region of Bengal in what was then British India.

References

Moths described in 1863
Lymantriinae